Maya High School is a public charter high school in Phoenix, Arizona. It is managed by The Leona Group. It is a member of the Canyon Athletic Association.

References

Public high schools in Arizona
The Leona Group
Charter schools in Arizona